Indragiri Hilir (or Lower Indragiri) is a regency (kabupaten) of Riau Province, Indonesia. It is located on the island of Sumatra. The regency has an area of 13,525.10 km2 and had a population of 661,779 at the 2010 census. The annual statistics through the 2010-2020 decade indicated a steady growth, and the final pre-census estimate predicted for 2020 was 747,813; however the 2020 census revealed there had been an actual small decline over the decade to a figure of 654,909. The administrative centre of the regency is the town of Tembilahan.

Administrative districts
The regency is divided into twenty districts (kecamatan), listed below with their areas and their populations at the 2010 census and the 2020 census. The table also includes the locations of the district administrative centres, and the number of villages (rural desa and urban kelurahan) in each district.

Airports 
The only public airport in Indragiri Hilir is Tempuling Airport. There is also a private airport located in Pelangiran District owned by PT THIP.

External links

References 

Regencies of Riau